Kanak Serakh Darab Pir (also Romanized as Kanak Serakh Dārāb Pīr; also known as Dārāb Pīr) is a village in Kakavand-e Gharbi Rural District, Kakavand District, Delfan County, Lorestan Province, Iran. At the 2006 census, its population was 115, in 20 families.

References 

Towns and villages in Delfan County